Konstantin Sergeyevich Bazelyuk (born 12 April 1993) is a Russian football forward. He plays for Neftekhimik Nizhnekamsk.

Career

Club
Born in Krasnodar Krai to a Russian father and a Pontic Greek mother.

Bazelyuk made his debut in the Russian Premier League for PFC CSKA Moscow on 14 September 2013 in a game against FC Rostov. After coming as a substitute at the 68th minute, 3 minutes later he scored a goal, giving his team a 1–0 victory.

Bazelyuk won the award for the Russian League's Best Young Player 2013.

In June 2016, Bazelyuk joined Estoril on loan for the 2016–17 season.

On 20 June 2017, Bazelyuk signed another season-long loan contract, this time with FC Anzhi Makhachkala. On 11 January 2018, Bazelyuk's contract with Anzhi was terminated, and he joined Zbrojovka Brno on loan for the remainder of the 2017/18 season.

On 14 June, CSKA Moscow announced that Bazelyuk would spend the 2018–19 season on loan at FC SKA-Khabarovsk.
On 10 June 2019, CSKA Moscow announced that Bazelyuk had left the club following the expiration of his contract.

On 4 July 2019, he signed with FC Mordovia Saransk.

Career statistics

Club

Honours

Club
CSKA Moscow
Russian Premier League (1): 2013–14

References

External links
 
 
 

1993 births
People from Anapa
Sportspeople from Krasnodar Krai
Living people
Russian footballers
Russia youth international footballers
Russia under-21 international footballers
Association football forwards
PFC CSKA Moscow players
FC Torpedo Moscow players
FC SKA-Khabarovsk players
G.D. Estoril Praia players
FC Anzhi Makhachkala players
FC Zbrojovka Brno players
FC Mordovia Saransk players
FC Akron Tolyatti players
FC Neftekhimik Nizhnekamsk players
Russian Premier League players
Primeira Liga players
Czech First League players
Russian First League players
Russian expatriate footballers
Expatriate footballers in Portugal
Russian expatriate sportspeople in Portugal
Expatriate footballers in the Czech Republic
Russian expatriate sportspeople in the Czech Republic